Ben Shikongo (born 8 May 2000) is a Namibian cricketer. He made his first-class debut for Namibia in the 2017–18 Sunfoil 3-Day Cup on 8 February  2018. Prior to his first-class debut, he was named in Namibia's squad for the 2018 Under-19 Cricket World Cup. He made his List A debut for Namibia in the 2017–18 CSA Provincial One-Day Challenge on 11 February 2018.

In June 2019, he was one of twenty-five cricketers to be named in Cricket Namibia's Elite Men's Squad ahead of the 2019–20 international season. He made his Twenty20 International (T20I) debut for Namibia against Botswana on 19 August 2019 during Botswana's tour of Namibia. Later the same month, he was named in Namibia's One Day International (ODI) squad for the 2019 United States Tri-Nation Series.

In September 2019, he was named in Namibia's squad for the 2019 ICC T20 World Cup Qualifier tournament in the United Arab Emirates. In December 2019, he was named in Namibia's One Day International (ODI) squad for the 2020 Oman Tri-Nation Series. He made his ODI debut for Namibia, against the United Arab Emirates, on 6 January 2020.

In September 2021, Shikongo was named in Namibia's squad for the 2021 ICC Men's T20 World Cup.

References

External links
 

2000 births
Living people
Namibian cricketers
Namibia One Day International cricketers
Namibia Twenty20 International cricketers
Place of birth missing (living people)